Thennakoon Mudiyanselage Rajith Keerthi Thennakoon is the former Governor of Uva, Southern and Central Provinces of Sri Lanka. He also served as Executive Director of polls monitoring body Campaign for Free and Fair Elections(CaFFE).

References

Living people
Year of birth missing (living people)
Governors of Central Province, Sri Lanka
Sinhalese civil servants
Place of birth missing (living people)